Einar Maynard Gunderson (July 6, 1899 – January 11, 1980) was a chartered accountant and political figure in British Columbia. He represented Similkameen in the Legislative Assembly of British Columbia in 1953 as a Social Credit member.

Gunderson served as president of the Institute of Chartered Accountants of Alberta in 1936. He was first elected to the assembly in a 1952 by-election held after Harry Denyer Francis resigned his seat to allow Gunderson to run for a seat in the assembly. Gunderson served briefly in the provincial cabinet as Finance Minister. Although he was unsuccessful when he ran for reelection in the general election held in 1953 and a subsequent by-election later that year, Gunderson continued to serve as financial adviser to W.A.C. Bennett's government. He also served as vice-president of the Pacific Great Eastern Railway and as a director of the British Columbia Toll Bridge and Highways Authority, of the Canadian Bank of Commerce, of Black Ball Ferries Ltd. and of Deeks-McBride Ltd., a cement and gravel supply company. Gunderson was a member of the board of governors for the University of British Columbia from 1957 to 1968. In 1967, he was named provisional chairman of the Bank of British Columbia. Gunderson also served on the board of directors for BC Hydro until the NDP came into power in 1972; he was removed from the board of directors of BC Rail at the same time. He died in Vancouver at the age of 80 in 1980.

References

External links 
 

1980 deaths
British Columbia Social Credit Party MLAs
Canadian accountants
Canadian bankers
Canadian Imperial Bank of Commerce people
Finance ministers of British Columbia
Members of the Executive Council of British Columbia
University of British Columbia people
Year of birth uncertain
20th-century Canadian politicians
1899 births